Asemonea tanikawai is a jumping spider species in the family Salticidae.

Description
It is light in colour, generally whitish-yellow in colour. The species resembles both Asemonea maculata and Asemonea pinangensis, particularly the female.

Distribution
Asemonea tanikawai is found in Japan, and is particularly widely distributed on the island of Okinawa.

References

Salticidae
Spiders of Asia
Chelicerates of Japan
Endemic fauna of Japan
Spiders described in 1996